Bermuda Drain is a studio album by the American artist Prurient, the stage name of Dominick Fernow. The album was released on July 11, 2011 through Hydra Head Records, and was the first release from Prurient through the label. Prurient released a single for the opening track "Many Jewels Surround the Crown" for Record Store Day in 2011.

Background
About Bermuda Drain's musical style, distinctive feeling and setting, Fernow said: "Upon a recent tour of Europe, I was constantly listening to minimal techno on headphones, driving at night through tunnels, and exhausted all of the records I had brought with me. The album is meant to satisfy that feeling. I've always felt connected to landscapes, moving through them, and their linear nature. Time passing. Watching as the world rolls over you while being divorced from it. The visual essence of feedback is a thin line, just like the structure of the landscape."

Concept
From lyrics, Bermuda Drain features an ambiguous plot; it chronicles the protagonist torturing and killing someone baited into meeting them, yet still featuring descriptive and near psychedelic imagery and scenery. As with all of Dominick's albums that feature lyrics, his mother and writer Jean Feraca assisted with lyrical content and narratives.

Critical reception
Bermuda Drain was met with "generally favorable" reviews from critics. At Metacritic, which assigns a weighted average rating out of 100 to reviews from mainstream publications, this release received an average score of 79 based on 9 reviews.

In a review for Consequence of Sound, critic reviewer Adam Kivel wrote: "The album works out to much that same tune, a sort of head-scratching confusion. It can be difficult to separate this album both in its difference from Fernow's past output and from the connections that it holds to his work with Cold Cave. Despite the ability to place this on a continuum, this is a record that sounds so dissimilar from its kin, a unique new version of an old favorite." At Pitchfork, Jess Harvell explained: "Bermuda Ground isn't just pleasant by contrast with Prurient's old unholy racket. It's often actively enjoyable, albeit in a decidedly creepy way, rooted as much in familiar retro-rock moves as formless face-eating noise. Perhaps it's down to Fernow's time playing in the decidedly more accessible and anthemic synth-pop/post-punk act Cold Cave, but Bermuda Drain is full of distortion-free keyboard, perverse disco beats, moments of beauty, even hooks." Jason Heller from The A.V. Club gave high praise for the release, noting that it's Prurient's "strongest statement to date, and its best album."

Track listing

Personnel
Bermuda Drain personnel adapted from AllMusic.

Music and lyrics
 Jean Feraca – lyric assistant
 Dominick Fernow 
 Kris Lapke – percussion, synthesizer

Production
 Dominick Fernow – production
 Kris Lapke – engineering, mastering, mixing, production

Artwork and packaging
 Dominick Fernow – art direction
 Ari Marcopoulos – photography
 Nikolai Saveliev – design

References

External links
 
 
 Bermuda Drain on Bandcamp

2011 albums
Prurient albums
Hydra Head Records albums